The 2018 FIBA U18 African Championship was the 19th edition, played under the rules of FIBA, the world governing body for basketball, and the FIBA Africa thereof. The tournament was hosted by Mali from 24 August to 2 September 2018 in Bamako. The finalists of this championship earned the right to represent the continent at the 2019 FIBA Under-19 Basketball World Cup in Greece.

Hosts Selection
On 23 March 2018, FIBA Africa Central Board announced that Bamako, Mali as the host city for the tournament.

Qualification

Qualified teams
as of 19 August 2018:
  − Tournament Hosts
  − Zone VI
  − Zone V
  − Zone I
  − Zone V Winner
  − Zone VII
  − Zone II Winner
  − Zone I
  − Zone IV
  − Zone II

Preliminary round 
All times are local (UTC+2).

Group A

Group B

Knockout stage
All times are local (UTC+2).
Championship bracket

5-8th bracket

9-11th bracket

Quarter finals

9−11th place classification

9th place match

5–8th place classification

Semifinals

7th place match

5th place match

Bronze medal match

Final

Final standings

Awards

All-Tournament Team

Notes

References

FIBA Africa Under-18 Championship
2018 in Malian sport
2018 in African basketball
International basketball competitions hosted by Mali
August 2018 sports events in Africa
September 2018 sports events in Africa